Anant Tare (1953/4 – 22 February 2021) was an Indian politician and leader of Shiv Sena from Thane and former Mayor of Thane, Maharashtra. He was member of Maharashtra Legislative Council from 2000 to 2006. He was former Mayor of Thane Municipal Corporation. He belonged to the Koli community of Maharashtra. He died on 22 February 2021.

Positions held
 2000: Elected to Maharashtra Legislative Council
 2008 Onwards: Deputy Leader, Shiv Sena  
 2015: Shiv Sena Sampark Pramukh Palghar district

See also
 List of members of the Maharashtra Legislative Council

References

External links
 Shivsena Home Page

1950s births
Year of birth uncertain
Place of birth missing
2021 deaths
Shiv Sena politicians
Members of the Maharashtra Legislative Council
Marathi politicians
Mayors of places in Maharashtra
Mayors of Thane
Koli people